Frederick Bowles (1875 – 20 March 1956) was a New Zealand cricketer. He played in one first-class matches for Wellington in 1911/12.

See also
 List of Wellington representative cricketers

References

External links
 

1875 births
1956 deaths
New Zealand cricketers
Wellington cricketers
Sportspeople from Maidstone